The Great Swindle is a 1971 Spanish-Italian thriller film directed by José Antonio Nieves Conde. It tells the story of a woman, Carla, who deceives and seduces several people, as she and others take on false identities and try to outsmart each other in deadly intrigues. The film's Spanish title is Historia de una traición. It has two alternative Italian titles: Nel buio del terrore and Diabolicamente sole con il delitto.

Cast
 Marisa Mell as Carla
 Stephen Boyd as Arturo
 Fernando Rey as Luis
 Massimo Serato as Hugo
 Simón Andreu as the pilot
 María Martín as Regina
 Sylva Koscina as Lola

References

External links

1970s thriller films
1971 films
Films directed by José Antonio Nieves Conde
Italian thriller films
Spanish thriller films
1970s Spanish-language films
1970s Italian films